is a professional Japanese baseball player. He plays pitcher for the Hiroshima Toyo Carp.

External links

 NPB.com

1976 births
Living people
Baseball people from Fukui Prefecture
Japanese baseball players
Nippon Professional Baseball pitchers
Hiroshima Toyo Carp players
Japanese baseball coaches
Nippon Professional Baseball coaches